The 1998 Tri Nations Series was contested from 11 July to 22 August between the Australia, New Zealand and South Africa national rugby union teams. The Springboks won the tournament.

Australia won the Bledisloe Cup, which New Zealand had won for the 3 previous years. The two Tri-Nations tests gave it a winning 2–0 lead. (It went on to make it 3–0 in the third test which came after the Tri-Nations.)

Table

Results

Game 1: Australia v New Zealand

Game 2: Australia v South Africa

Notes:
 This was the first rugby test match staged at Subiaco Oval.

Game 3: New Zealand v South Africa

Game 4: New Zealand v Australia

Game 5: South Africa v New Zealand

Game 6: South Africa v Australia

References

External links
Tri Nations at Rugby.com.au

Tri Nations Series
The Rugby Championship
Tri
Tri
Tri Nations